The Illinois Psychological Association (IPA) is the largest professional association of psychologists in Illinois, with approximately 1,200 licensed, non-licensed, associate, organizational, and student members.

IPA's mission statement: The purpose of the IPA shall be to advance psychology as a science and a profession and as a means of promoting human welfare by the encouragement of psychology in all its branches; by the continual improvement of the qualifications of psychologists through high standards of ethics, conduct, education and achievement; by expanding roles and opportunities for psychologists to serve the public within the field’s emerging scope of scholarship and expertise; and by the increase and dissemination of psychological knowledge through meetings, professional contacts, reports, papers, discussion, publications, electronic media, and current methods of communication.

IPA has 11 Sections – interest groups for various specialties and subspecialties of psychology or topical areas. It is also one of the largest state psychological associations in the United States and is affiliated with the American Psychological Association. The organization has its headquarters in downtown Chicago, Illinois. The IPA hosts an annual convention in the fall. IPA also publishes a quarterly newsletter, the Illinois Psychologist.

Prescribing Psychologists in Illinois 
In 2014, under the leadership of President Beth Rom-Rymer and IPA's Legislative Committee, Illinois was the third state to pass legislation enabling clinical psychologists to prescribe psychotropic medication with additional education and training, also known as the Prescriptive authority for psychologists movement (RxP). Illinois' RxP law requires that, in order to become a prescribing psychologist, one must complete undergraduate biomedical coursework (medical terminology, biology, chemistry, microbiology, anatomy & physiology), obtain a master's degree in clinical psychopharmacology, pass a national examination (Psychopharmacology Examination for Psychologists; PEP), and complete a prescribing psychology residency. The residency must include nine medical rotations (family medicine, internal medicine, psychiatry, pediatrics, geriatrics, obstetrics/gynecology, surgery, emergency medicine, elective) that span no fewer than 14 months and no more than 28 months. One must also engage in these rotations for at least 20 hours per week. After one is licensed as a prescribing psychologist, there are several restrictions. For example, a prescribing psychologist in Illinois must have a collaborating physician that reviews their orders at least monthly. Additionally, they may not be delegated the authority to prescribe Schedule II controlled substances, may not treat pregnant women, those with serious medical conditions, or individuals under 17 years or above 65 years old. They may also not prescribe medications to be delivered by injection or Schedule III benzodiazepines. As of early 2023, there is legislation in the Illinois General Assembly that, if passed, would remove the restrictions based on age and to prescribe Schedule II controlled substances. It would also ensure that prescribing psychologists are recognized and reimbursed by Illinois Medicaid.

As of November 2022, there are 14 licensed prescribing psychologists in Illinois, with approximately 50 more in the training pipeline.

Profile

Governance 
IPA is a non-profit corporation in the State of Illinois. IPA's bylaws describe structural components that provide for checks and balances to ensure a democratic process. The organizational entities include:

 IPA President: The IPA's president is elected by the membership and serves a three-year term as part of the presidential trio (e.g., President-Elect, President, Past President). The president chairs the Council of Representatives and Executive Committee. During their term in office, the president performs such duties as prescribed in the bylaws.
IPA Executive Committee: The Executive Committee (EC) is composed of the officers of the Association (President, President-Elect, Past President, Secretary, Treasurer) and the IPA Representative to the APA Council of Representatives. The EC handles the day-to-day business of the organization and is empowered to act on behalf of the Association between IPA Council of Representative meetings. The EC meets monthly.
 IPA Council of Representatives: The Council has sole authority to set policy and make decisions regarding IPA's assets. It is composed of 24 elected members: the officers, representatives from various regions across the state (e.g., North, Metropolitan, North Central, South Central, South), as well as section chairs of the association. The Council of Representatives meets quarterly.
 IPA Committee Structure: Members of committees conduct much of the Association's work on a volunteer basis. They carry out a wide variety of tasks suggested by their names.

Council of Representatives Structure 
IPA has 11 Sections that represent specialties or subspecialties in psychology or topical areas. IPA also has seven Regional Representatives that represent all geographic regions of Illinois. Each Section Chair and Region Representative is a voting member of the IPA Council of Representatives. Each Section Chair and Region Representative serves a renewable, two-year term.

IPA Sections 
Academic
Behavioral Medicine & Neuropsychology
Clinical Practice
Early Career Psychologists
Ethnic Minority Affairs
Graduate Students
Military and Public Safety Psychology
Organizational & Business Consulting
Sexual Orientation & Gender Diversity
Social Responsibility
Women's Issues

Regions 
North
Metropolitan
North Central
South Central
South

Press Releases 
Endorsement of Statement on Gun Reform

In June 2022, under the leadership of President Dr. Abigail Brown, the IPA Council of Representatives endorsed the American Psychological Association's call for gun reform in the wake of the mass shooting in Uvalde, Texas in May 2022.

Endorsement of Statement on Restricting Access to Abortion

In May 2022, under the leadership of President Dr. Abigail Brown, the IPA Council of Representatives endorsed the American Psychological Association's statement on the likely mental health harms associated with denying access to abortion in light of the possibility of the overturning of Roe v. Wade by the United States Supreme Court.

Statement Against Police Brutality 
In June 2020, under the leadership of President Dr. Kalyani Gopal, the IPA Council of Representatives approved and released a "Statement Against Police Brutality" in light of the race-related events around the United States in the summer of 2020.

Statement on the Separation of Families at the Border 
In July 2018, under the leadership of President Dr. Lynda Behrendt, the IPA Council of Representatives approved and released a "Statement Against the Separation of Families at the Border" in response to the federal government's policy to separate families who arrived at the U.S.-Mexico border.

IPA Presidents (1949 – present) 
2022 – 2023 Derek Phillips, PsyD, MSCP, ABMP
2021 –  2022 Abigail Brown, PsyD
2020 – 2021 Daniel Brewer, PsyD
2019 – 2020 Kalyani Gopal, PhD
2018 – 2019 Lynda Behrendt, PsyD
2017 – 2018 Laura L. Faynor-Ciha, PhD
2016 – 2017 Joseph E. Troiani, PhD
2015 – 2016 Karla Steingraber, PsyD
2014 – 2015 Blaine Lesnik, PsyD
2013 – 2014 Beth N. Rom-Rymer, PhD
2012 – 2013 Patricia Farrell, PhD
2011 – 2012 Beth N. Rom-Rymer, PhD
2010 – 2011 Gregory Sarlo, PsyD
2009 – 2010 Steven Rothke, PhD, ABPP
2008 – 2009 Gregory Sarlo, PsyD
2007 – 2008 Steven Rothke, PhD, ABPP
2006 – 2007 Eleanore Ryan, PhD
2005 – 2006 John Blattner, PhD
2004 – 2005 Armand R. Cerbone, PhD, ABPP
2003 – 2004 Mary E. Halpin, PhD
2002 – 2003 Kenneth H. Kessler, PhD
2001 – 2002 Marlin Hoover, PhD, ABPP
2000 – 2001 Nancy Molitor, PhD
1999 – 2000 Katherine B. Klehr, PhD
1998 – 1999 Chris E. Stout, PsyD, MBA
1997 – 1998 John R. Day, PhD
1996 – 1997 Patricia A. Pimental, PsyD, ABN
1995 – 1996 Lisa R. Grossman, JD, PhD
1994 – 1995 Nancy A. Slagg, PhD
1993 – 1994 Ronald H. Rozensky, PhD, ABPP
1992 – 1993 Randy J. Georgemiller, PhD
1991 – 1992 Donald Paull, PhD, JD, ABPP
1990 – 1991 Terrence J. Koller, PhD, ABPP
1989 – 1990 Bruce E. Bonecutter, PhD
1988 – 1989 Jean J.  Rossi, PhD
1987 – 1988 Joseph S. Maciejko, PhD
1986 – 1987 Michael Mercer, PhD
1985 – 1986 Joseph F. Pribyl, PhD
1984 – 1985 Edmund J. Nightingale, PhD, ABPP
1983 – 1984 Sue E. Moriearty, PhD
1982 – 1983 Mary Ann Poprick, PhD
1981 – 1982 Daniel Beach, PhD
1980 – 1981 Ian Wickram, PhD
1979 – 1980 Mary Kay Pribyl, PhD
1978 – 1979 Thomas Hollan, PhD
1977 – 1978 Bruce E. Bennett, PhD
1976 – 1977 Robert P. Barrell, PhD
1975 – 1976 Sol Rosenberg, PhD
1974 – 1975 Robert C. Nicolay, PhD
1973 – 1974 Helen Sunukjian, PhD
1972 – 1973 Virginia Harris, PhD
1971 – 1972 Walter Friendhoff, PhD
1970 – 1971 Alan Rosenwald, PhD
1969 – 1970 Vin Rosenthal, PhD
1968 – 1969 Charles Dewey, PhD
1967 – 1968 Joseph Wepman, PhD
1966 – 1967 Fred Spaner, PhD
1965 – 1966 Albert Hunsicker, PhD
1964 – 1965 Leroy Vernon, PhD
1963 – 1964 Phillip Ash, PhD
1962 – 1963 Robert McFarland, PhD
1961 – 1962 A. Arthur Hartman, PhD
1960 – 1961 Alan Rosenwald, PhD
1959 – 1960 Ralh Heine, PhD
1958 – 1959 George Speer, PhD
1957 – 1958 Noble Kelley, PhD
1956 – 1957 Leo Hellmer, PhD
1955 – 1956 William Sloan, PhD
1954 – 1955 Stanley Marzolf, PhD
1953 – 1954 George Yacorzynski, PhD
1952 – 1953 Ross Stagner, PhD
1951 – 1952 Irwin Berg, PhD
1950 – 1951 James Miller, PhD
1949 – 1950 Robert Seashore, PhD

References 

Medical and health professional associations in Chicago
Psychology organizations based in the United States
1936 establishments in Illinois
501(c)(6) nonprofit organizations
Non-profit organizations based in Chicago